Prelude and Fugue in C-sharp minor, BWV 873, is a keyboard composition written by Johann Sebastian Bach in 1738. 
It is the 4th prelude and fugue in Book II of The Well-Tempered Clavier.

Prelude 

The prelude is in the time signature of 9/8 time. It is in the key of C-sharp minor. The Prelude is heavily ornamented with mordents and appoggiaturas.

Fugue 

The fugue is in 12/16 time. It is also in C-sharp minor. Unlike its prelude, the fugue does not have much ornamentation.

References

The Well-Tempered Clavier
Compositions in C-sharp minor